Josef Lenzel (21 April 1890 – 3 July 1942) was a German Roman Catholic priest active in resistance movement against the National Socialism, who died in the Dachau concentration camp where he had been sent as a result of his work with Polish forced labourers.

Biography 

Lenzel was born in 1891 in Breslau (now Wrocław) in Prussian Silesia. He became a vicar in Wołów immediately after this, and in 1916 became a vicar in Berlin-Pankow. In 1929, he became a rector, then a titulary provost of St Mary Magdalene’s parish in Berlin-Niederschönhausen. During the Second World War, he helped Polish obligatory workers in his parish; his help was viewed unkindly by local Nazi authorities. In , during his preparations for a mass for maltreated Poles, he was arrested by the Gestapo and then sent to the Dachau concentration camp.

Memorials 
 Commemorative plaque in a crypt of St. Hedwig's Cathedral,
 Commemorative plaque on a symbolic tomb in memorial of Josef Lenzel, in front of St Mary Magdalene’s parish in Berlin-Niederschönhausen
 Street named Pfarrer-Lenzel-Straße in Berlin-Pankow.

Bibliography 
 Helmut Moll, Ursula Pruss, Pfarrer Josef Lenzel. In: Zeugen für Christus. Das deutsche Martyrologium des 20. Jahrhunderts. von  im Auftrag der Deutschen Bischofskonferenz. site 101–104. Verlag Ferdinand Schöningh, Paderborn 1999
 Heinz Kühn, Blutzeugen des Bistums Berlin. Klausener, Lichtenberg, Lampert, Lorenz, Simoleit, Mandrella, Hirsch, Wachsmann, Metzger, Schäfer, Willimsky, Lenzel, Froehlich.'' Morus-Verlag, Berlin 1952

External links 
 Website of Diocese of Münster: Josef Lenzel’s biography  (German)
 Website of Archidiocese of Berlin:  Reminiscence of priest Josef Lenzel as a victim of nazism (German)

References

1890 births
1942 deaths
Roman Catholics in the German Resistance
German civilians killed in World War II
Resistance members who died in Nazi concentration camps
German people who died in Dachau concentration camp
Martyred Roman Catholic priests
20th-century Roman Catholic martyrs
20th-century venerated Christians
People from the Province of Silesia
Clergy from Wrocław
Clergy from Berlin
20th-century German Roman Catholic priests